Jasper Swift (died 20 January 1620) was the archdeacon of Cornwall and Archdeacon of Totnes.

Educated at Christ Church, Oxford, he matriculated in 1590/1, graduating B.A. in 1594 and M.A. in 1599/1600. He was awarded B.D. and D.D. in 1615/16 and became rector of St. Erme, Cornwall in 1603 and of Powderham, Devon in 1612. He became prebendary of Exeter cathedral in 1613, archdeacon of Cornwall July–October 1616, and archdeacon of Totnes from 1616, until his death on 20 January 1619/20.

References

Archdeacons of Totnes
Archdeacons of Cornwall
1620 deaths
Year of birth unknown